During the 1962–63 Scottish football season, Celtic competed in Scottish Division One.

Results

Scottish Division One

Scottish Cup

Scottish League Cup

Inter-Cities Fairs Cup

Glasgow Cup

References

External links
 Video clip of the Scottish Cup final by Pathé News

Celtic F.C. seasons
Celtic